Bulleidia is a Gram-positive, non-spore-forming, anaerobic and non-motile genus from the family of Erysipelotrichidae, with one known species (Bulleidia extructa).

Phylogeny
The currently accepted taxonomy is based on the List of Prokaryotic names with Standing in Nomenclature (LPSN) and National Center for Biotechnology Information (NCBI)

See also
 List of bacterial orders
 List of bacteria genera

References

Further reading 
 

Erysipelotrichia
Monotypic bacteria genera
Bacteria genera